The 2018 Texas Rangers season was the 58th of the Texas Rangers franchise overall, their 47th in Arlington as the Rangers, and their 25th season at Globe Life Park in Arlington. The Rangers began the season on March 29 against the Houston Astros and finished the season on September 30 against the Seattle Mariners.

The Rangers completed a 5–4 triple play in their 8–6 win over the Los Angeles Angels on August 16. It was only the third 5–4 triple play in the expansion era (since 1961). It was also the first triple play since 1912 in which the batter was not retired. The Rangers set a new club record with 13 extra-base hits in a game against the Minnesota Twins on September 2.

On September 21, the Rangers fired Jeff Banister as manager following much speculation. Bench coach Don Wakamatsu was promoted to interim manager for the final 10 games of the season.

Opening Day lineup

Source:

Standings

American League West

American League Wild Card

Record against opponents

Game log

|- style="background:#fbb"
| 1 || March 29 || Astros || 1–4 || Verlander (1–0) || Hamels (0–1) || — || 47,253 || 0–1 || L1 
|- style="background:#cfc"
| 2 || March 30 || Astros || 5–1 || Fister (1–0) || Keuchel (0–1) || — || 35,469 || 1–1 || W1 
|- style="background:#fbb"
| 3 || March 31 || Astros || 3–9 || McCullers (1–0) || Moore (0–1) || — || 36,892 || 1–2 || L1
|-

|- style="background:#fbb"
| 4 || April 1 || Astros || 2–8 || Cole (1–0) || Minor (0–1) || — || 26,758 || 1–3 || L2
|- style="background:#fbb"
| 5 || April 2 || @ Athletics || 1–3 || Hatcher (2–0) || Jepsen (0–1) || Treinen (1) || 7,416 || 1–4 || L3
|- style="background:#cfc"
| 6 || April 3 || @ Athletics || 4–1 || Hamels (1–1) || Graveman (0–1) || Kela (1) || 9,157 || 2–4 || W1
|- style="background:#fbb"
| 7 || April 4 || @ Athletics || 2–6 || Manaea (1–1) || Fister (1–1) || — || 7,908 || 2–5 || L1 
|- style="background:#cfc"
| 8 || April 5 || @ Athletics || 6–3 || Pérez (1–0) || Mengden (0–2) || Kela (2) || 10,132 || 3–5 || W1 
|- style="background:#fbb"
| 9 || April 6 || Blue Jays || 5–8 || Estrada (1–0) || Moore (0–2) || Osuna (3) || 21,670 || 3–6 || L1
|- style="background:#cfc"
| 10 || April 7 || Blue Jays || 5–1 || Minor (1–1) || Stroman (0–1) || — || 26,229
|| 4–6 || W1
|- style="background:#fbb"
| 11 || April 8 || Blue Jays || 4–7 || García (1–0) || Hamels (1–2) || Osuna (4) || 26.902 || 4–7 || L1
|- style="background:#fbb"
| 12 || April 9 || Angels || 3–8 || Álvarez (1–0) || Fister (1–2) || — || 16,718 || 4–8 || L2
|- style="background:#fbb"
| 13 || April 10 || Angels || 1–11 || Skaggs (2–0) || Pérez (1–1) || — || 18,697 || 4–9 || L3
|- style="background:#fbb"
| 14 || April 11 || Angels || 2–7 || Barría (1–0) || Moore (0–3) || Middleton (2) || 20,363 || 4–10 || L4
|- style="background:#fbb"
| 15 || April 13 || @ Astros || 2–3 || Smith (1–0) || Jepsen (0–2) || — || 32,129 || 4–11 || L5
|- style="background:#cfc"
| 16 || April 14 || @ Astros || 6–5 (10) || Kela (1–0) || Harris (0–1) || Claudio (1) || 40,679 || 5–11 || W1
|- style="background:#cfc"
| 17 || April 15 || @ Astros || 3–1 (10) || Kela (2–0) || Rondon (1–1) || Diekman (1) || 31,803 || 6–11 || W2
|- style="background:#fbb"
| 18 || April 16 || @ Rays || 4–8 || Snell (2–1) || Pérez (1–2) || — || 9,363 || 6–12 || L1
|- style="background:#cfc"
| 19 || April 17 || @ Rays || 7–2 || Moore (1–3) || Chirinos (0–1) || — || 8,972 || 7–12 || W1 
|- style="background:#fbb"
| 20 || April 18 || @ Rays || 2–4 || Faria (1–1) || Hamels (1–3) || Colomé (4) || 8,657 || 7–13 || L1
|- style="background:#fbb"
| 21 || April 20 || Mariners || 2–6 || Nicasio (1–0) || Kela (2–1) || — || 27,811 || 7–14 || L2 
|- style="background:#fbb"
| 22 || April 21 || Mariners || 7–9 || Bradford (2–0) || Claudio (0–1) || Diaz (8) || 39,016 || 7–15 || L3
|- style="background:#cfc"
| 23 || April 22 || Mariners || 7–4 || Pérez (2–2) || Ramirez (0–1) || Kela (3) || 33,661 || 8–15 || W1
|- style="background:#fbb"
| 24 || April 23 || Athletics || 4–9 || Buchter (1–0) || Jepsen (0–3) || — || 17,060 || 8–16 || L1
|- style="background:#fbb"
| 25 || April 24 || Athletics || 2–3 || Triggs (2–0) || Hamels (1–4) || Casilla (1) || 19,391 || 8–17 || L2 
|- style="background:#cfc"
| 26 || April 25 || Athletics || 4–2 || Chavez (1–0) || Graveman (0–5) || Kela (4) || 19,121 || 9–17 || W1 
|- style="background:#cfc"
| 27 || April 27 || @ Blue Jays || 6–4 || Minor (2–1) || Stroman (0–3) || Kela (5) || 26,312 || 10–17 || W2
|- style="background:#cfc"
| 28 || April 28 || @ Blue Jays || 7–4 || Colón (1–0) || García (2–2) || Kela (6) || 39,176 || 11–17 || W3
|- style="background:#fbb"
| 29 || April 29 || @ Blue Jays || 2–7 || Happ (4–1) || Pérez (2–3) || — || 31,669 || 11–18 || L1
|- style="background:#fbb"
| 30 || April 30 || @ Indians || 5–7 || Allen (2–0) || Martin (0–1) || Beliveau (1) || 12,851 || 11–19 || L2
|-

|- style="background:#cfc"
| 31 || May 1 || @ Indians || 8–6 (12) || Claudio (1–1) || Goody (0–2) || — || 16,356 || 12–19 || W1
|- style="background:#fbb"
| 32 || May 2 || @ Indians || 4–12 || Kluber (5–1) || Moore (1–4) || — || 15,637 || 12–20 || L1
|- style="background:#cfc"
| 33 || May 3 || Red Sox || 11–5 || Minor (3–1) || Price (2–4) || — || 22,348 || 13–20 || W1
|- style="background:#fbb"
| 34 || May 4 || Red Sox || 1–5 || Porcello (5–0) || Colón (1–1) || — || 31,404 || 13–21 || L1
|- style="background:#fbb"
| 35 || May 5 || Red Sox || 5–6 || Kelly (1–0) || Kela (2–2) || Kimbrel (9) || 35,728 || 13–22 || L2
|- style="background:#fbb"
| 36 || May 6 || Red Sox || 1–6 || Sale (3–1) || Fister (1–3) || — || 28,360 || 13–23 || L3
|- style="background:#cfc"
| 37 || May 7 || Tigers || 7–6 || Leclerc (1–0) || Stumpf (1–2) || Kela (7) || 20,057 || 14–23 || W1
|- style="background:#fbb"
| 38 || May 8 || Tigers || 4–7 || Fiers (3–2) || Minor (3–2) || Greene (7) || 18,634 || 14–24 || L1
|- style="background:#cfc"
| 39 || May 9 || Tigers || 5–4 (10) || Kela (3–2) || Saupold (1–1) || — || 30,387 || 15–24 || W1
|- style="background:#cfc"
| 40 || May 11 || @ Astros || 1–0 || Hamels (2–4) || Verlander (4–2) || Kela (8) || 34,297 || 16–24 || W2
|- style="background:#fbb"
| 41 || May 12 || @ Astros || 1–6 ||Morton (5-0)|| Fister (1-4) || — || 36,482 || 16–25 || L1
|- style="background:#fbb"
| 42 || May 13 || @ Astros || 1–6 || Keuchel (3–5) || Moore (1–5) || — || 39,405 || 16–26 || L2
|- style="background:#fbb"
| 43 || May 15 || @ Mariners || 8–9 (11) || Goeddel (2–0) || Claudio (1–2) || — || 14,670 || 16–27 || L3
|- style="background:#cfc"
| 44 || May 16 || @ Mariners || 5–1 || Colón (2–1) || Pazos (1–1) || — || 20,629 || 17–27 || W1 
|- style="background:#fbb"
| 45 || May 17 || @ White Sox || 2–4 || Avilán (1–0) || Leclerc (1–1) || Jones (2) || 17,666 || 17–28 || L1
|- style="background:#cfc"
| 46 || May 18 || @ White Sox || 12–5 || Chavez (2–0) || Fulmer (2–4) || — || 16,373 || 18–28 || W1
|- style="background:#fbb"
| 47 || May 19 || @ White Sox || 3–5 || Giolito (3–4) || Jurado (0–1) || Jones (3) || 25,611 || 18–29 || L1
|- style="background:#fbb"
| 48 || May 20 || @ White Sox || 0–3 || Lopez (1–3) || Minor (3–3) || Fry (1) || 16,829 || 18–30 || L2
|- style="background:#fbb"
| 49 || May 21 || Yankees || 5–10 || Tanaka (5–2) || Colón (2–2) || — || 29,553 || 18–31 || L3
|- style="background:#cfc"
| 50 || May 22 || Yankees || 6–4 || Hamels (3–4) || German (0–2) || Kela (9) || 30,325 || 19–31 || W1
|- style="background:#cfc"
| 51 || May 23 || Yankees || 12–10 || Claudio (2–2) || Robertson (3–2) || Kela (10) || 31,304 || 20–31 || W2
|- style="background:#fbb"
| 52 || May 24 || Royals || 2–8 || Duffy (2–6) || Bibens-Dirkx (0–1) || — || 23,230 || 20–32 || L1
|- style="background:#cfc"
| 53 || May 25 || Royals || 8–4 || Minor (4–3) || Skoglund (1–5) || Kela (11) || 35,105 || 21–32 || W1
|- style="background:#cfc"
| 54 || May 26 || Royals || 4–3 (10) || Claudio (3–2) || McCarthy (3–2) || — || 29,644 || 22–32 || W2
|- style="background:#fbb"
| 55 || May 27 || Royals || 3–5 || Hammel (2–5)||Hamels (3–5) || Herrera (11) || 31,898 || 22–33 || L1
|- style="background:#fbb"
| 56 || May 28 || @ Mariners || 1–2 || Gonzales (5–3)||Fister (1–5) || Diaz (19) || 26,236 || 22–34 || L2
|- style="background:#cfc"
| 57 || May 29 || @ Mariners || 9–5 || Claudio (4–2) || Díaz (0–2) || — || 13,259 || 23–34 || W1
|- style="background:#cfc"
| 58 || May 30 || @ Mariners || 7–6 || Barnette (1–0) || Rzepczynski (0–1) || Kela (12) || 13,070 || 24–34 || W2
|- style="background:#fbb"
| 59 || May 31 || @ Mariners || 1–6 || LeBlanc (1–0) || Minor (4–4) || — || 15,630 || 24–35 || L1 
|-

|- style="background:#fbb"
| 60 || June 1 || @ Angels || 0–6 || Barria (5–1) || Colón (2–3) || — || 33,511 || 24–36 || L2
|- style="background:#cfc"
| 61 || June 2 || @ Angels || 3–2 (10) || Diekman (1–0) || Álvarez (2–2) || Kela (13) || 44,603 || 25–36 || W1
|- style="background:#fbb"
| 62 || June 3 || @ Angels || 1–3 || Skaggs (4–4) || Fister (1–6) || Anderson (2) || 33,541 || 25–37 || L1
|- style="background:#cfc"
| 63 || June 5 || Athletics || 7–4 || Martin (1–1) || Trivino (3–1) || Kela (14) || 19,470 || 26–37 || W1
|- style="background:#cfc"
| 64 || June 6 || Athletics || 8–2 || Colón (3–3) || Mengden (6–5) || — || 22,335 || 27–37 || W2
|- style="background:#fbb"
| 65 || June 7 || Astros || 2–5 || Cole (7–1) || Hamels (3–6) || — || 30,236 || 27–38 || L1
|- style="background:#fbb"
| 66 || June 8 || Astros || 3–7 || Verlander (8–2) || Fister (1–7) || — || 31,722 || 27–39 || L2
|- style="background:#fbb"
| 67 || June 9 || Astros || 3–4 || Sipp (1–0) || Leclerc (1–2) || Rondon (2) || 38,068 || 27–40 || L3
|- style="background:#fbb"
| 68 || June 10 || Astros || 7–8 || Harris (2–3) || Kela (3–3) || Rondon (3) || 30,251 || 27–41 || L4
|- style="background:#fbb"
| 69 || June 12 || @ Dodgers || 5–12 || Paredes (1–0) || Colón (3–4) || Corcino (1) || 48,233 || 27–42 || L5
|- style="background:#fbb"
| 70 || June 13 || @ Dodgers || 2–3 || Liberatore (2–1) || Chavez (2–1) || — || 41,303 || 27–43 || L6
|- style="background:#fbb"
| 71 || June 15 || Rockies || 5–9 || Bettis (5–1) || Mendez (0–1) || — || 30,448 || 27–44 || L7
|- style="background:#cfc"
| 72 || June 16 || Rockies || 5–2 || Leclerc (2–2) || Musgrave (0–2) || Kela (15) || 23,468 || 28–44 || W1
|- style="background:#cfc"
| 73 || June 17 || Rockies || 13–12 || Chavez (3–1) || Davis (0–2) || — || 25,513 || 29–44 || W2
|- style="background:#cfc"
| 74 || June 18 || @ Royals || 6–3 || Colón (4–4) || Kennedy (1–7) || Kela (16) || 18,319 || 30–44 || W3
|- style="background:#cfc"
| 75 || June 19 || @ Royals || 4–1 || Hamels (4–6) || Hammel (2–8) || Kela (17) || 17,789 || 31–44 || W4
|- style="background:#cfc"
| 76 || June 20 || @ Royals || 3–2 ||Bibens-Dirkx (1–1) ||Junis (5–8) || Diekman (2)|| 19,489 || 32–44 || W5
|- style="background:#cfc"
| 77 || June 22 || @ Twins || 8–1 || Minor (5–4) || Romero (3–3) ||Chavez (1) || 28,004 || 33–44 || W6
|- style="background:#cfc"
| 78 || June 23 || @ Twins || 9–6 || Gallardo (1–0) || Odorizzi (3–5) || Kela (18) || 23,230 || 34–44 || W7
|- style="background:#fbb"
| 79 || June 24 || @ Twins || 0–2 ||Berríos (8–5) ||Colón (4–5) || Rodney (17) ||23,633 || 34–45 ||L1
|- style="background:#cfc"
| 80 || June 25 || Padres || 7–4 || Barnette (2–0) || Stammen (4–1) || Kela (19) || 23,470 || 35–45 || W1
|- style="background:#fbb"
| 81 || June 26 || Padres || 2–3 || Strahm (2–2) || Diekman (1–1) || Hand (22) || 21,780 || 35–46 || L1
|- style="background:#cfc"
| 82 || June 27 || Padres || 5–2 || Minor (6–4) || Richard (7–7) || Kela (20) || 21,365 || 36–46 || W1
|- style="background:#cfc"
| 83 || June 29 || White Sox || 11–3 || Gallardo (2–0) || Covey (3–3) || — || 28,156 || 37–46 || W2
|- style="background:#cfc"
| 84 || June 30 || White Sox || 13–4 || Colón (5–5) || Rodon (1–3) || — || 28,138 || 38–46 || W3
|-

|- style="background:#fbb"
| 85 || July 1 || White Sox || 5–10 ||López (4–5) ||Hamels (4–7) ||Soria (12) || 22,684 || 38–47 || L1
|- style="background:#fbb"
| 86 || July 3 || Astros || 3–5 ||Keuchel (5–8) ||Bibens-Dirkx (1–2) ||Rondón (6) || 40,165 || 38–48 ||L2 
|- style="background:#fbb"
| 87 || July 4 || Astros || 4–5 (10) ||McHugh (4–0) ||Martin (1–2) ||Giles (12) || 43,592 || 38–49 ||L3
|- style="background:#cfc"
| 88 || July 5 || @ Tigers || 7–5 ||Gallardo (3–0) ||Boyd (4–7) ||Kela (21) || 21,248 || 39–49 || W1 
|- style="background:#fbb"
| 89 || July 6 || @ Tigers || 1–3 ||Zimmermann (4–0) ||Colón (5–6) ||Jiménez (3) || 27,316 || 39–50 ||L1
|- style="background:#fbb"
| 90 || July 7 || @ Tigers || 2–7 || Fiers (6–5) ||Hamels (4–8) || — || 29,174 || 39–51 ||L2
|- style="background:#cfc"
| 91 || July 8 || @ Tigers || 3–0 ||Bibens-Dirkx (2–2) ||Fulmer (3–8) ||Kela (22) || 22,047 || 40–51 ||W1
|- style="background:#fbb"
| 92 || July 9 || @ Red Sox || 0–5 ||Rodríguez (11–3) ||Minor (6–5) || — || 36,754 || 40–52 ||L1
|- style="background:#fbb"
| 93 || July 10 || @ Red Sox || 4–8 ||Barnes (3–2) ||Gallardo (3–1) || — || 36,883 || 40–53 ||L2
|- style="background:#fbb"
| 94 || July 11 || @ Red Sox || 2–4 ||Sale (10–4) || Colón (5–7) ||Kimbrel (28) || 36,920 || 40–54 ||L3
|- style="background:#cfc"
| 95 || July 13 || @ Orioles || 5–4 ||Hamels (5–8) || Cobb (2–12) ||Kela (23) || 17,348 || 41–54 ||W1
|- style="background:#fbb"
| 96 || July 14 || @ Orioles || 0–1 ||Brach (1–2) ||Pérez (2–4) ||Britton (3) || 38,328 || 41–55 ||L1
|- style="background:#fbb"
| 97 || July 15 || @ Orioles || 5–6 ||Scott (1–1) ||Minor (6–6) ||Britton (4) || 18,754 || 41–56 ||L2
|- style="text-align:center; background:#bbcaff;"
| colspan="10" | 89th All-Star Game in Washington, D.C.
|- style="background:#fbb"
| 98 || July 20 || Indians || 8–9 (11) ||McAllister (1–2) ||Moore (1–6) ||Otero (1) || 28,253 || 41–57 ||L3
|- style="background:#fbb"
| 99 || July 21 || Indians || 3–16 ||Carrasco (12–3) ||Colón (5–8) || — || 31,532 || 41–58 ||L4 
|- style="background:#cfc"
| 100 || July 22 || Indians || 5–0 ||Gallardo (4–1) ||Clevinger (7–6) || — || 21,829 || 42–58 ||W1
|- style="background:#fbb"
| 101 || July 23 || Athletics || 3–15 ||Anderson (2–2) ||Hamels (5–9) || — || 18,744 || 42–59 ||L1
|- style="background:#fbb"
| 102 || July 24 || Athletics || 10–13 (10) ||Familia (6–4) ||Bibens-Dirkx (2–3) ||Treinen (25) || 18,249 || 42–60 ||L2
|- style="background:#fbb"
| 103 || July 25 || Athletics || 5–6 ||Trivino (8–1) ||Leclerc (2–3) ||Treinen (26) || 20,549 || 42–61 ||L3
|- style="background:#fbb"
| 104 || July 26 || Athletics || 6–7 ||Cahill (2–2) ||Colón (5–9) ||Treinen (27) || 20,533 || 42–62 ||L4
|- style="background:#cfc"
| 105 || July 27 || @ Astros || 11–2 ||Gallardo (5–1) ||Keuchel (8–9) || — || 42,592 || 43–62 ||W1
|- style="background:#cfc"
| 106 || July 28 || @ Astros || 7–3 ||Jurado (1–1) ||Verlander (10–6) || — || 43,093 || 44–62 ||W2
|- style="background:#cfc"
| 107 || July 29 || @ Astros || 4–3 ||Minor (7–6) ||McCullers (10–6) ||Kela (24) || 40,560 || 45–62 ||W3
|- style="background:#cfc"
| 108 || July 30 || @ Dbacks || 9–5 || Butler (2–1) || Andriese (3–5) || — || 20,639 || 46–62 || W4
|- style="background:#fbb"
| 109 || July 31 || @ Dbacks || 0–6 ||Godley (12–6) ||Colón (5–10) || — || 21,877 || 46–63 ||L1
|-

|- style="background:#cfc"
| 110 || August 2 || Orioles || 17–8 ||Gallardo (6–1) ||Cashner (3–10) ||Butler (1) || 19,367 || 47–63 ||W1
|- style="background:#cfc"
| 111 || August 3 || Orioles || 11–3 ||Jurado (2–1) ||Hess (2–6) || — || 22,544 || 48–63 ||W2
|- style="background:#cfc"
| 112 || August 4 || Orioles || 3–1 ||Minor (8–6) ||Bundy (7–10) ||Leclerc (1) || 24,300 || 49–63 ||W3
|- style="background:#fbb"
| 113 || August 5 || Orioles || 6–9 || Scott (2–2) || Hutchison (1–2) || Givens (2) || 19,961 || 49–64 || L1
|- style="background:#fbb"
| 114 || August 6 || Mariners || 3–4 (12) || Tuivailala (4–3) || Butler (2–2) || Díaz (42) || 17,759 || 49–65 || L2
|- style="background:#cfc"
| 115 || August 7 || Mariners || 11–4 || Colón (6–10) || Hernandez (8–10) || — || 17,575 || 50–65 || W1
|- style="background:#cfc"
| 116 || August 8 || Mariners || 11–7 || Gallardo (7–1) || Gonzales (12–7) || — || 20,116 || 51–65 || W2
|- style="background:#fbb"
| 117 || August 9 || @ Yankees || 3–7 || Happ (12–6) || Jurado (2–2) || — || 43,455 || 51–66 || L1
|- style="background:#cfc"
| 118 || August 10 || @ Yankees || 12–7 || Minor (9–6) || Tanaka (9–3) || — || 45,198 || 52–66 || W1
|- style="background:#fbb"
| 119 || August 11 || @ Yankees || 3–5 || Betances (3–3) || Martin (1–3) || Chapman (30) || 45,933 || 52–67 || L1 
|- style="background:#fbb"
| 120 || August 12 || @ Yankees || 2–7 || Sabathia (7–4) || Pérez (2–5) || — || 41,304 || 52–68 || L2
|- style="background:#cfc"
| 121 || August 13 || Dbacks || 5–3 || Colón (7–10) || Greinke (12–8) || Leclerc (2) || 18,204 || 53–68 || W1
|- style="background:#fbb"
| 122 || August 14 || Dbacks || 4–6 ||Corbin (10–4) ||Gallardo (7–2) ||Boxberger (27) || 19,353 || 53–69 ||L1
|- style="background:#cfc"
| 123 || August 16 || Angels || 8–6 ||Moore (2–6) ||Anderson (3–3) ||Leclerc (3) || 18,398 || 54–69 ||W1
|- style="background:#cfc"
| 124 || August 17 || Angels || 6–4 ||Hutchison (2–2) ||Despaigne (2–1) ||Leclerc (4) || 27,816 || 55–69 ||W2
|- style="background:#fbb"
| 125 || August 18 || Angels || 7–11 ||Bedrosian (5–2) ||Butler (2–3) || — || 24,768 || 55–70 ||L1
|- style="background:#cfc"
| 126 || August 19 || Angels || 4–2 ||Moore (3–6) ||Ramirez (4–4) ||Leclerc (5) || 26,681 || 56–70 ||W1
|- style="background:#fbb"
| 127 || August 20 || @ Athletics || 0–9 ||Fiers (9–6) ||Colón (7–11) || — || 9,341 || 56–71 ||L1
|- style="background:#fbb"
| 128 || August 21 || @ Athletics || 0–6 ||Anderson (3–3) ||Jurado (2–3) || — || 11,579 || 56–72 ||L2
|- style="background:#cfc"
| 129 || August 22 || @ Athletics || 4–2 ||Minor (10–6) ||Jackson (4–3) ||Leclerc (6) || 13,139 || 57–72 ||W1
|- style="background:#cfc"
| 130 || August 24 || @ Giants || 7–6 (10) || Gearrin (2–1) || Dyson (3–3) || Leclerc (7) || 39,845 || 58–72 || W2
|- style="background:#fbb"
| 131 || August 25 || @ Giants || 3–5 ||Suarez (5–9) ||Pérez (2–6) ||Melancon (2) || 40,287 || 58–73 ||L1
|- style="background:#fbb"
| 132 || August 26 || @ Giants || 1–3 ||Holland (7–8) ||Gallardo (7–3) ||Melancon (3) || 39,260 || 58–74 ||L2
|- style="background:#fbb"
| 133 || August 28 || Dodgers || 4–8 ||Ferguson (5–2) ||Jurado (2–4) || — || 30,123 || 58–75 ||L3
|- style="background:#fbb
| 134 || August 29 || Dodgers || 1–3 ||Wood (8–6) ||Minor (10–7) ||Maeda (1) || 29,181 || 58–76 ||L4
|- style="background:#fbb
| 135 || August 31 || Twins || 7–10 || Magill (3–2) || Moore (3–7) || — || 22,808 || 58–77 || L5
|-

|- style="background:#cfc"
| 136 || September 1 || Twins || 7–4 || Gallardo (8–3) || Berríos (11–10) || Leclerc (8) || 32,175 || 59–77 || W1
|- style="background:#cfc"
| 137 || September 2 || Twins || 18–4 || Méndez (1–1) || Moya (3–1) || Butler (2) || 23,423 || 60–77 || W2
|- style="background:#fbb"
| 138 || September 3 || Angels || 1–3 || Cole (1–2) || Curtis (0–1) || Parker (14) || 21,048 || 60–78 || L1
|- style="background:#cfc"
| 139 || September 4 || Angels || 4–2 || Minor (11–7) || Heaney (8–9) || Leclerc (9) || 17,625 || 61–78 || W1
|- style="background:#fbb"
| 140 || September 5 || Angels || 3–9 ||Barría (10–8) ||Colón (7–12) || — || 19,966 || 61–79 ||L1
|- style="background:#fbb"
| 141 || September 7 || @ Athletics || 4–8 || Petit (7–3) || Gallardo (8–4) || — || 15,572 || 61–80 || L2
|- style="background:#fbb"
| 142 || September 8 || @ Athletics || 6–8 || Buchter (4–0) || Martin (1–4) || Treinen (37) || 20,504 || 61–81 || L3
|- style="background:#fbb"
| 143 || September 9 || @ Athletics || 3–7 || Kelley (2–0) || Jurado (2–5) || — || 27,932 || 61–82 || L4
|- style="background:#cfc"
| 144 || September 10 || @ Angels || 5–2 || Minor (12–7) || Barria (10–9) || Leclerc (10) || 32,891 || 62–82 || W1
|- style="background:#fbb"
| 145 || September 11 || @ Angels || 0–1 || Ramirez (5–5) || Sampson (0–1) || Buttrey (2) || 33,756 || 62–83 || L1
|- style="background:#fbb"
| 146 || September 12 || @ Angels || 1–8 || Peña (3–4) || Gallardo (8–5) || — || 33,028 || 62–84 || L2
|- style="background:#cfc"
| 147 || September 14 || @ Padres || 4–0 || Méndez (2–1) || Erlin (3–7) || — || 22,740 || 63–84 || W1
|- style="background:#cfc"
| 148 || September 15 || @ Padres || 6–3 || Jurado (3–5) || Castillo (2–3) || Leclerc (11) || 28,833 || 64–84 || W2
|-style="background:#fbb"
| 149 || September 16 || @ Padres || 3–7 || Yates (5–3) || Springs (0–1) || — || 22,242 || 64–85 || L1
|-style="background:#fbb"
| 150 || September 17 || Rays || 0–3 || Glasnow (2–6) || Sampson (0–2) || Romo (22) || 21,840 || 64–86 || L2
|-style="background:#fbb"
| 151 || September 18 || Rays || 0–4 || Snell (20–5) || Gallardo (8–6) || — || 23,523 || 64–87 || L3
|-style="background:#fbb"
| 152 || September 19 || Rays || 3–9 ||Yarbrough  (15–5) ||Méndez (2–2) || — || 25,168 || 64–88 ||L4
|-style="background:#cfc"
| 153 || September 21 || Mariners || 8–3 (7) ||Jurado (4–5) ||Ramírez (2–4) || — || 29,420 || 65–88 ||W1
|-style="background:#fbb"
| 154 || September 22 || Mariners || 0–13 ||Gonzales (13–9) ||Minor (12–8) || — || 31,158 || 65–89 ||L1
|-style="background:#cfc"
| 155 || September 23 || Mariners || 6–1 || Springs (1–1) || LeBlanc (8–5) || — || 31,269 || 66–89 || W1
|-style="background:#fbb"
| 156 || September 24 || @ Angels || 4–5  || Cole (3–2) || Moore (3–8) || — || 29,052 || 66–90 ||L1
|-style="background:#fbb"
| 157 || September 25 || @ Angels || 1–4 || Ramirez (7–5) || Gallardo (8–7) || Robles (1) || 36,308 || 66–91 || L2
|-style="background:#fbb"
| 158 || September 26 || @ Angels || 2–3 ||Álvarez (6–4) ||Martin (1–5) ||Johnson (2) || 35,991 || 66–92 ||L3
|-style="background:#cfc"
| 159 || September 27 || @ Mariners || 2–0 || Jurado (5–5) || Duke (5–5) || Leclerc (12) || 15,799  || 67–92 ||W1
|-style="background:#fbb"
| 160 || September 28 || @ Mariners || 6–12 || LeBlanc (9–5) || Pérez (2–7) || — || 23,598 || 67–93 || L1
|-style="background:#fbb"
| 161 || September 29 || @ Mariners || 1–4 || Paxton (12–6) || Sampson (0–3) || Díaz (57) || 31,780 || 67–94 || L2
|-style="background:#fbb"
| 162 || September 30 || @ Mariners || 1–3 ||Elías (3–1) ||Gallardo (8–8) ||Armstrong (1) || 21,146 || 67–95 ||L3
|-

Detailed records

Roster

Farm system

References

External links

 2018 Texas Rangers season at Baseball-Reference.com
 2018 Texas Rangers Schedule and Statistics at MLB.com

Texas Rangers seasons
Texas Rangers
2018 in sports in Texas